Barnard Cobblestone House is a historic home located at Lima in Livingston County, New York. It is a two-story, three-bay side hall cobblestone structure built in the late Federal / early Greek Revival style. A remodeling in the 1880s added Queen Anne style details including the verandah. It features irregularly shaped, variously colored cobbles in its construction, although most are red sandstone.  Also on the property is a 19th-century carriage barn.

It was listed on the National Register of Historic Places in 1989.

References

Houses on the National Register of Historic Places in New York (state)
Cobblestone architecture
Houses in Livingston County, New York
National Register of Historic Places in Livingston County, New York